Erigeron aliceae is a species of flowering plant in the family Asteraceae known by the common name Alice Eastwood's fleabane, or simply Alice's fleabane. It was named for American botanist Alice Eastwood, 1859 - 1953.

Erigeron aliceae is a perennial native to the meadows and woodlands of the Pacific Northwest. It is found in western Washington, western Oregon, and the northwestern corner of California (Del Norte, Humboldt, Trinity, and Siskiyou Counties). There is a report of an isolated population in the Sierra Nevada east of Yuba City, but this might be an escape from cultivation.

Erigeron aliceae has branching stems reaching 50–100 cm (20–40 cm) in height, with hairy, rounded basal leaves and a few lance-shaped leaves along the narrow, hairy stems. The inflorescence at the top of each erect stem holds 1-7 flower heads, each one to two centimeters (0.4-0.8 inches) wide. The center is made up of many yellow disc florets and surrounded by a ring of up to 80 narrow ray florets in white to shades of light purple and blue.

References

External links
Jepson Manual Treatment
United States Department of Agriculture Plants Profile
calphotos Photo gallery, University of California

aliceae
Flora of California
Flora of Oregon
Flora of Washington (state)
Flora of the Klamath Mountains
Flora of the West Coast of the United States
Plants described in 1900
Flora without expected TNC conservation status